Monsieur Taxi is a 1952 French comedy film which was directed André Hunebelle, written by Jean Halain, and starring Michel Simon and Louis de Funès. It is about Pierre Verger, who is nicknamed Monsieur Taxi and always in company of a smart young dog called "Gangster". It was shot at the Saint-Maurice Studios in Paris and on location around the city including in Saint-Maur-des-Fossés. The film's sets were designed by the art director Lucien Carré.

Plot
Monsieur Taxi comes across a bag a passenger seems to have forgotten on the backseat. The bag contains a considerable amount of money and he is desperate to return it. While trying to find the owner of the bag he is eventually taken for a criminal and arrested by police. But in the end everything is straightened out and he lives to see his both children get married.

Cast 
 Michel Simon : Pierre Verger (Monsieur Taxi)
 Jane Marken : Louise, wife of Léon
 Jean Brochard : Léon, husband of Louise, policeman
 Monique Darbaud : Lily Minouche, the dancer
 Jean Carmet : François
 André Valmy : the main inspector
 Pauline Carton : the aunt of Lily
 Espanita Cortez : the Italian
 Jeanne Fusier-Gir : Mrs Angela
 Nathalie Nattier : La Rousse
 Louis de Funès : (uncredited)

References

External links 
 
 Monsieur Taxi (1952) at the Films de France

1952 films
French comedy films
1950s French-language films
French black-and-white films
Films directed by André Hunebelle
Films about taxis
1952 comedy films
Pathé films
1950s French films